The PlayStation 2 was designed to be backward compatible with PlayStation games. However, not all PlayStation games work on the PlayStation 2. In addition, later models of the PlayStation 2 console could not play all of the games that were released for prior versions of the PlayStation 2. This article provides a list of some of the PlayStation and PlayStation 2 games that are not compatible with some models of the PlayStation 2.

All models 
These PlayStation games have compatibility issues with all models of PlayStation 2:

PlayStation games
Alice in Cyberland (The boss battle may end on the first stage, and the progress may stop after the movie is played. There are other places where the same phenomenon occurs.)
Arcade Party Pak
Arcade's Greatest Hits: The Atari Collection 2
Armored Core - Master of Arena (In "SHOP", some parts may not be displayed. In addition, not limited to this screen, a symptom that the image stops may occur.)
Densha Daisuki (After selecting "NEW GAME" and displaying the operation timetable, the image stops when loading from the disc.)
Digimon Rumble Arena (Massive slowdown during certain stages, making it unplayable.)
Dokapon! Ikari no Tetsuken (After the battle is over, the screen may not be displayed normally.)
Dragon Beat (The picture stops when a player tries to start the game.)
Fighter Maker
Final Fantasy Anthology
Formula One 99 (Sound effects do not sound properly during the game.)
Fun! Fun! Pingu (If the analog controller is set to analog mode, the progress will stop when loading from the disc. There is no problem in the digital mode.)
Gallop Racer (Information such as horse name and record is not displayed on the race result display screen after the race is over.)
Gradius Deluxe Pack (In "GRADIUS II", the speed during the game is slow.)
Harvest Moon - Back to Nature (The progress of the game may stop without the next screen appearing when switching screens.)
Hello Kitty's Cube Frenzy (The progress of the game stops without the next screen appearing when switching screens.)
Idol Promotion - Yumie Suzuki (On disc 2 (bonus disc), when the start button is pressed on the title screen, noise continues to sound after that.)
Judge Dredd
Konya mo Dorubako!! 2000 (When switching screens or loading from a disc, the symptom that the image stops frequently occurs.)
Marionette Company 2 Chu!
Monkey Hero (After leaving Main Menu, screen stays black)
Monster Rancher / Monster Farm (The symptom that the image stops on the screen displaying the match result of the league match frequently occurs.)
Mortal Kombat Trilogy (Works mostly, but if either the timer on the continue screen runs out or the game is beaten, the game will freeze.)
Namco Anthology Vol.02 (Arranged version of "King of Kings" may stop progress.)
Namco Museum Encore (Of the 7 titles recorded, 2 titles, "Wonder Momo" and "Rolling Thunder," are slow in the game.)
Namco Museum Vol.2 (In "Xevious", the speed during the game is slow.)
Not Treasure Hunter (When loading game data on a memory card and when switching screens after the game is over, the symptom that the image stops frequently occurs.)
Ongaku Tsukuru - Kanade-Ru 2 (The song data on the memory card cannot be loaded in the "jukebox".)
Oukyuu No Hihou Tension (The map display is not displayed properly in the dungeon.)
Shisha no Yobu Yakata - Pandora Max Series Vol.2 (The game progress may stop when the screen is switched.)
Shuukan Gallop - Blood Master (During the game, when switching screens, the game may stop progressing without the next screen appearing.)
Spec Ops: Stealth Patrol (Game may not allow players to save.)
Street Fighter Alpha 2 / Street Fighter Zero 2 (The picture may stop when the match begins.)
Susume! Kaizoku - Be Pirates! (When a player win the attacked ship in the game and check the loot they have acquired, the picture stops on the loot explanation screen.)
Konya mo Dorubako!! 2000 (When switching screens or loading from a disc, the symptom that the image stops frequently occurs.)
The X-Files
Toaplan Shooting Battle 1 (In "Ultimate TIGER" and "TWIN COBRA", the speed during the game is slow.)
Tomba! (The NTSC version freezes when loading a save file)
Tsuridou - Keiryuu Mizuumihen (When a player try to display the screen by selecting "Option", it is not displayed.)
Twins Story - Kimi ni Tsutaetakute (After setting items on the schedule screen, the image stops when the execution starts.)
Virtua Pachi-Slot EX (BGM and sound effects do not sound normally.)
Virtua Pachi-Slot V - Yamasa, Kitadenshi, Olympia  (BGM and sound effects do not sound normally.)
Virtua Pachi-Slot VI (BGM and sound effects do not sound normally.)
Wing Commander III - Heart of the Tiger (During video playback, the screen blacks out, an error message is displayed at the top of the screen, and the image stops.)

SCPH-500XX 
The SCPH-500XX models may have issues running the following games:

PlayStation games
Army Men 3D (Game does not read on SCPH-500XX PAL v10 consoles.)

SCPH-750XX to SCPH-900XX 
The following games may have issues with the SCPH-750XX, SCPH-770XX, SCPH-790XX & SCPH-900XX "slim" model PlayStation 2, reported by Sony Japan, America and Europe.

PlayStation games
007 - Tomorrow Never Dies
3X3 Eyes - Tenrinou Genmu (The screen may stop at "Character introduction" in the main menu "Sankei Feast Digest".)
Action Man: Destruction X
Action Puzzle - Prism Land (Sound effects do not play properly in the title menu, pause menu, and optional "SE test".)
Actua Ice Hockey 2
AFL '99
Air Management '96 (During the game, BGM does not sound properly when the player does not operate directly.)
Akuji the Heartless
Albalea No Otome - Uruwashi No Seishikitachi (BGM is not played properly at an event where "Jill" and "Sleia" have a conversation.)
Alice in Cyberland (The boss battle may end on the first stage, and the progress may stop after the movie is played. There are other places where the same phenomenon occurs.)
Aqua GT
Arcade Party Pak
Arcade's Greatest Hits: The Atari Collection 2
Area 51 ( PAL Only )
Armored Core - Master of Arena (In "SHOP", some parts may not be displayed. In addition, not limited to this screen, a symptom that the image stops may occur.)
Aubirdforce After (BGM is not played normally on the battle screen.)
Barbie: Race & Ride
Broken Helix
Bubsy 3D (The levels don't load up on NTSC copies. The PAL release has no such issues.)
Castrol Honda Superbike World Champions
Castrol Honda Superbike 2000
Cheesy (Password screen cursor moves too fast, making it difficult to input password correctly)
Chrono Cross (In the ending movie, part of the video is not displayed properly.)
Command & Conquer: Red Alert - Retaliation
Crash Bash
Croc 2
Dave Mirra Freestyle BMX (On the loading screen after selecting a course, the image in the center window may be displayed in a half gray.)
Densha Daisuki (After selecting "NEW GAME" and displaying the operation timetable, the image stops when loading from the disc.)
Deserted Island (The screen may not be displayed properly in some scenes during the game.)
Devil Dice
Disney's 102 Dalmatians: Puppies to the Rescue
Dokapon! Ikari no Tetsuken (After the battle is over, the screen may not be displayed normally.)
Doraemon - Nobitaito Fukkatsu no hoshi (The operating speed of the game is generally slow.)
Dragon Beat (The picture stops when try to start the game.)
Driver (The game randomly slows down, and when played using an original DualShock, the pause menu may open on its own.)
Elder Gate / Eldergate (The screen after "Gate rush" is not displayed normally.)
FIFA: Road to World Cup 98
F.A. Manager
Fighter Maker
Final Fantasy Anthology
Formula One Arcade
Formula One 98 (The main menu flickers.)
Formula One 99 (Sound effects do not sound properly during the game.)
Fun! Fun! Pingu (If the analog controller is set to analog mode, the progress will stop when loading from the disc. There is no problem in the digital mode.)
Gallop Racer (Information such as horse name and record is not displayed on the race result display screen after the race is over.)
Gekisou Tomarunner (The screen may freeze if a player take first place on the first course of the "Tomaran Tournament" in the game.)
Gradius Deluxe Pack (In "GRADIUS II", the speed during the game is slow.)
Grid Runner
Gundam: Battle Assault
Hard Boiled
Harvest Moon - Back to Nature (The progress of the game may stop without the next screen appearing when switching screens.)
Heart of Darkness (Console doesn't recognise the discs)
Hello Kitty's Cube Frenzy (The progress of the game stops without the next screen appearing when switching screens.)
Hissatsu Pachinko Station 9 - Ushiwaka to Lemi (BGM in the game may not sound normally.)
Hooters Road Trip
Houma Hunter Lime - Special Collection Vol.2 (The screen may freeze at some points during the game. When entering the OPTION screen in the title menu, etc.)
Hugo 2
Idol Promotion - Yumie Suzuki (On disc 2 (bonus disc), when the start button is pressed on the title screen, noise continues to sound after that.)
Indy 500
International Superstar Soccer Pro
In Cold Blood
Jackie Chan Stuntmaster
Jampack Vol. 2
Jigoku Sensei Nube (The screen may not be displayed properly in the movie when the game is started.)
Jikki Pachi-Slot Tettel Kouryaku - Speed-Cr Kinkakuji 3 (When playing with a pachislot controller (SLPH-00098) connected, saving game data may fail. * This symptom does not occur when a normal controller is connected.)
Judge Dredd
Kasei Monogatari (Registration may not be performed correctly when changing the "ASCII GRIP V" setting.)
Konya mo Dorubako!! 2000 (When switching screens or loading from a disc, the symptom that the image stops frequently occurs.)
Krazy Ivan (Each item may blink on the aircraft setting screen after clearing the stage.)
Lemmings
Logic Puzzle Rainbow Town (The screen freezes when the game starts.)
Lunar 2: Eternal Blue Complete
Lupin the Third Chateau De Cagliostro (The screen freezes when the game starts on Disc 2 or 3 of and replace it with another Disc.)
Magic: The Gathering Battlemage
Marionette Company 2 Chu!
Megatudo 2096 (When "KEY CONFIG" or "RECORDS" is selected from the title menu, the screen is not displayed normally.)
Mitsumete Knight R - Daibouken Hen (If a player reset the game, the screen may freeze after the logo is displayed immediately after restarting.)
Mobile Suit Gundam - Char's Counterattack (In "STAGE 2" during the game, part of the video may not be displayed properly.)
Monkey Hero
Monster Rancher / Monster Farm (The symptom that the image stops on the screen displaying the match result of the league match frequently occurs.)
Moorhuhn 3
Mortal Kombat Trilogy
Muppet Monster Adventure
Murakoshi Seikai no Bakuchou Seabass Fishing (Sound effects are not played normally in "SE TEST" on the DISC 1 option screen.)
Namco Anthology Vol.02 (Arranged version of "King of Kings" may stop progress.)
Namco Museum Encore (Of the 7 titles recorded, 2 titles, "Wonder Momo" and "Rolling Thunder," are slow in the game.)
Namco Museum Vol.2 (In "Xevious", the speed during the game is slow.)
Namco Soccer Prime Goal / J.League Soccer Prime Goal EX (Characters may not be displayed properly in "penalty shootouts" during the game.)
Newman Haas Racing
NFL Gameday
NFL Xtreme
NHL 2000
NHL 2001
NHL Blades of Steel 2000
NHL Rock the Rink
Not Treasure Hunter (When loading game data on a memory card and when switching screens after the game is over, the symptom that the image stops frequently occurs.)
Nuclear Strike
Omizu no Hanamichi (The screen may not be displayed properly in some scenes during the game.)
One
Ongaku Tsukuru - Kanade-Ru 2 (The song data on the memory card cannot be loaded in the "jukebox".)
Oukyuu No Hihou Tension (The map display is not displayed properly in the dungeon.)
Pink Panther - Pinkadelic Pursuit
PO'ed
Premier Manager 99
Racingroovy (On the "COURSE SELECT" screen, the screen may stop if the course is changed continuously.)
Rascal / Bubblegun Kid (The operating speed of the game is generally slow.)
Resident Evil 2 / Biohazard 2 (After selecting "NEW GAME" in the game, the sound may not be played normally on a part of the movie screen.)
Resident Evil 3: Nemesis
Rushdown
Sentient
Shadow Madness
Shadow Master
Shin Fortune Quest - Shokutaku no Kishi-tachi (When selecting the character "Pastel" in the game, the character may not be displayed properly.)
Shisha no Yobu Yakata - Pandora Max Series Vol.2 (The game progress may stop when the screen is switched.)
Shoryu Sangokuengi (The screen freezes after the logo is displayed when the game starts.)
Shuukan Gallop - Blood Master (During the game, when switching screens, the game may stop progressing without the next screen appearing.)
Speed Freaks / Speed Punks
SpongeBob SquarePants: SuperSponge
Sold Out (The screen freezes after playing the movie when the game starts.)
Spyro 3 - Year of the Dragon (Very rare frame drops, game is playable.)
Star Wars: Episode I – The Phantom Menace (Major sound glitches, minor to major graphical issues, control issues with DualShock 1, sometimes freezes.)
Street Fighter Alpha 2 / Street Fighter Zero 2 (The picture may stop when the match begins.)
Street Fighter: The Movie
Street Racer
Super Puzzle Fighter II Turbo
Susume! Kaizoku - Be Pirates! (When a player win the attacked ship in the game and check the loot they have acquired, the picture stops on the loot explanation screen.)
Syphon Filter 2
Syphon Filter 3
Taiko Risshiden III (When saving to a memory card, writing may fail.)
Taikyoku Igo - Heisei Kiin (The screen does not display properly in some scenes during the game.)
Tanaka Torahiko no Ultra-ryuu Shougi - Ibisha Anaguma-hen (The screen is not displayed normally on the environment setting screen after selecting "Option" from the title menu.)
Test Drive 4 (If a player make specific settings in "Options" of the title menu, part of the course may not be displayed properly.)
Test Drive Off-Road / Gekitotsu! Yonku Battle (The screen may not be displayed properly in the ending movie during the game.)
The City of Lost Children
The Hive
The Hoobs
The Land Before Time: Great Valley Racing Adventure
The X-Files
Three Lions
Toaplan Shooting Battle 1 (In "Ultimate TIGER" and "TWIN COBRA", the speed during the game is slow.)
Tomba!
Transport Tycoon
Tsuridou - Keiryuu Mizuumihen (When a player try to display the screen by selecting "Option", it is not displayed.)
Twins Story - Kimi ni Tsutaetakute (After setting items on the schedule screen, the image stops when the execution starts.)
Twisted Metal 2: World Tour
Ultimate Fighting Championship
U.P.P. (The screen may not be displayed properly after the logo is displayed when the game is started.)
Vandal Hearts II
Victory Boxing Contender
Vigilante 8
Virtua Pachi-Slot EX (BGM and sound effects do not sound normally.)
Virtua Pachi-Slot V - Yamasa, Kitadenshi, Olympia  (BGM and sound effects do not sound normally.)
Virtua Pachi-Slot VI (BGM and sound effects do not sound normally.)
VR Sports Powerboat Racing
Walt Disney World Quest: Magical Racing Tour
Warpath: Jurassic Park
Westlife Fan-O-Mania
Wing Commander III - Heart of the Tiger (During video playback, the screen blacks out, an error message is displayed at the top of the screen, and the image stops.)
Worms (The title movie and opening movie at the time of starting the game are not played normally, and the game proceeds to the next scene.)

PlayStation 2 games
AC Milan Club Football 2005
Arsenal Club Football 2005
Aston Villa Club Football 2005
Ai Yori Aoshi - Limited Edition (During the game, BGM may not be played normally or the screen may freeze.)
ATV Offroad Fury 3
Bakusou Dekotora Densetsu - Otoko Hanamichi Yume Roman (The screen may freeze during the race. - SCPH 750XX series only)
Beyond Good & Evil (The sound effects keep repeating.)
Big Mutha Truckers
Big Mutha Truckers 2: Truck Me Harder
Birmingham City Club Football 2005
Chelsea Club Football 2005
Destruction Derby Arenas
Duel Masters - Birth of Super Dragon (The screen may stop when the game is played with the character "Kyoshiro Kokujo" equipped with armor. - SCPH-750XX series only)
ESPN NBA 2K5
EverQuest Online Adventures: Frontiers
EA Sports F1 2001 (The screen may freeze after the logo is displayed when the game is started.)
F1 2002 (With GT-FORCE connected the screen may stop after the logo is displayed. This doesn't occur when it's connected after the game is started or a DualShock 2 is connected.)
Fight Night Round 2
Final Fantasy XI (100% incompatible with the system, as the game requires the PlayStation 2 Hard Disk Drive, with which the Slimline doesn't support or fit.)
Gadget & the Gadgetinis
Gauntlet Dark Legacy (The screen may freeze after playing the movie when the game starts.) 
Get on Da Mic 
Initial D Special Stage (After skipping the opening movie, the screen may stop immediately after selecting each game mode from the title screen. - SCPH-750XX series only) 
International Cue Club 2 
Hitman: Contracts (It takes some time to create save data.) 
Jak X: Combat Racing
Kaido Touge no Densetsu (When colliding with a wall or guardrail during a race, the sound effect may continue to be played. - SCPH-750XX series only)
Lethal Skies Elite Pilot: Team SW
Looney Tunes: Back in Action
Major League Baseball 2K5
MX World Tour
Naruto: Uzumaki Chronicles (The disc is unable to be read most of the time. After starting there are no issues. - SCPH-750XX series only)
Onimusha: Warlords
Racing Battle - C1 Grand Prix (When colliding with a wall or guardrail during a race, the sound effect may continue to be played.)
Shin Bakusou Dekotora Densetsu (The screen may freeze during the race. - SCPH-750XX series only)
Shutokou Battle 01 (When colliding with a wall or guardrail during a race, the sound effect may continue to be played. - SCPH-750XX series only)
Silent Hill 3
Simple 2000 Ultimate Series Vol. 22 - Stylish Mahjong Usagi (The screen may freeze on the data save screen after changing the option.)
SOCOM II U.S. Navy SEALs
SpongeBob SquarePants: Lights, Camera, Pants!
SRS: Street Racing Syndicate
Super Monkey Ball Deluxe (PAL version works with no issues on slim.) 
SWAT: Global Strike Team
Tekken 5 (If "Tekken 3" selected in ARCADE HISTORY where a player can enjoy successive games, the screen may stop after the save screen. - SCPH-750XX series only)
Tiger Woods PGA Tour 2005
Tom Clancy's Ghost Recon: Jungle Storm
Ty the Tasmanian Tiger 3: Night of the Quinkan (Game does not work on NTSC consoles)
Usagi Yasei no Topai (The screen may freeze on the data save screen after changing the option.)
Wacky Races Starring Dastardly & Muttley (PAL version works with no issues on slim.)

References

 
1 games incompatible with PlayStation 2